Events from the year 1903 in the United Kingdom.

Incumbents
 Monarch – Edward VII
 Prime Minister – Arthur Balfour (Coalition)
 Parliament – 27th

Events
 1 January – Edward VII is proclaimed Emperor of India.
 19 January – first transatlantic radio broadcast between United States and Britain.
 27 January – fire at Colney Hatch Lunatic Asylum kills 51.
 12 February – Randall Davidson enthroned as Archbishop of Canterbury, a position he will hold for 25 years.
 13 February – Venezuelan crisis. After agreeing to arbitration in Washington, Britain, Germany and Italy reach a settlement with Venezuela, resulting in the Washington Protocols. The naval blockade that began in December 1902 will be lifted, and Venezuela commits 30% of its customs duties to settling claims.
 3 March – The Admiralty announces plans to build a naval base at Rosyth on the Firth of Forth.
 24 March & 3 May – Derby earthquakes.
 1 April – Midwives Act 1902 comes into effect, regulating the profession of midwifery in England and Wales. 
 14 April – Aberdeen Football Club is established.
 18 April – Bury F.C. beat Derby County by an all-time record 6 goals to nil to win the 1903 FA Cup Final.
 23 April – Budget removes Corn Duty.
 29 May – Bradford City Football Club is established.
 19 June – Caernarfon earthquake.
 7 July – British take over the Fulani empire.
 August – 2nd Congress of the Russian Social Democratic Labour Party moves from Brussels to London.
 September – First Garden City Ltd formed to develop Letchworth.
 16 September – Joseph Chamberlain resigns as Colonial Secretary.
 10 October – foundation of the militant Women's Social and Political Union by Emmeline and Christabel Pankhurst in Manchester.
 31 October – opening of Hampden Park football ground in Glasgow in Scotland.
 October:
 Opening of Willow Tearooms, Sauchiehall Street, Glasgow, designed by Charles Rennie Mackintosh for Catherine Cranston.
 2 November – Daily Mirror launched as a newspaper for women, run by women.

Undated
 First Poor Prisoners' Defence Act provides for limited legal aid.
 The University of Liverpool becomes independent of Victoria University.
 "Typhoo Tipps" tea first marketed.
 Montague Burton establishes a business retailing ready-made men's suits in Chesterfield, Derbyshire, origin of the Burton and Arcadia Group brands.
 William Randal Cremer wins the Nobel Peace Prize.
 Percy Furnivall carries out the first known case of cardiac surgery in Britain.
 The remains of "Cheddar Man" are found within Gough's Cave in Cheddar Gorge, Britain's oldest complete human skeleton, dating to approximately 7150 BCE.
 Osea Island off Maldon, Essex, is bought by Frederick Nicholas Charrington to provide an addiction treatment centre.
 Rock Sand wins the English Triple Crown by finishing first in the Epsom Derby, 2,000 Guineas and St Leger.

Publications
 Edward Harold Begbie's novel Lost in Blunderland (under the pseudonym Caroline Lewis).
 Samuel Butler's semi-autobiographical novel The Way of All Flesh (posthumous).
 George Gissing's semi-autobiographical novel The Private Papers of Henry Ryecroft.
 John Morley's biography The Life of Gladstone, which sells more than 25,000 copies in its first year.

Births
 7 January – Alan Napier, actor (died 1988)
 18 January
 Gladys Hooper, née Nash, pianist and supercentenarian (died 2016)
 Kathleen Shaw, figure skater (died 1983)
 22 February – Frank P. Ramsey, mathematician (died 1930)
 4 March – Dorothy Mackaill, British-born American actress (died 1990)
 24 March – Malcolm Muggeridge, journalist, author and media personality (died 1990)
 31 March – H. J. Blackham, humanist and author (died 2009)
 15 April – John Williams, actor (died 1983)
 20 May – Barbara Hepworth, sculptor (died 1975)
 29 May – Bob Hope, British-born comedian (died 2003)
 19 June – Wally Hammond, cricketer (died 1965)
 25 June – George Orwell, author (died 1950)
 29 June – Alan Blumlein, electronics engineer (died 1942)
 1 July – Amy Johnson, aviator (died 1941)
 2 July – Alec Douglas-Home, Prime Minister (died 1995)
 3 July – David Webster, Scottish-born arts administrator (died 1971)
 4 July – Vernon Sewell, film director and screenwriter (died 2001)
 7 July – Steven Runciman, historian (died 2000)
 10 July – John Wyndham, English author (died 1969)
 12 July – Judith Hare, Countess of Listowel, Hungarian-born writer and journalist (died 2003)
 11 July – Rudolf Abel (alias of Vilyam "Willie" Genrikhovich Fisher), English-born spy for the Soviet Union (died 1971)
 13 July – Kenneth Clark, art historian (died 1983)
 26 July – Amy Gentry, rower (died 1976)
 28 July – Ernst Wilhelm Bohle, English-born Nazi German statesman (died 1960)
 7 August – Louis Leakey, paleoanthropologist, born in British East Africa (died 1972)
 24 August – Graham Sutherland, artist (died 1980)
 2 September – Fred Pratt Green, Methodist minister and hymn writer (died 2000)
 7 September – Jock Wilson, soldier (died 2008)
 9 September – Edward Upward, author (died 2009)
 28 October – Evelyn Waugh, writer (died 1966)
 29 October – Vivian Ellis, composer and lyricist (died 1996)
 31 October – Joan Robinson, economist (died 1983)
 1 November – Max Adrian, Irish-born actor (died 1973)
 5 November – Joan Barry, actress (died 1989)
 11 November – Thomas Allibone, physicist (died 2003)
 4 December – A. L. Rowse, historian (died 1997)
 5 December – Cecil Frank Powell, physicist, Nobel Prize laureate (died 1969)
 10 December – Mary Norton, children's author (died 1992)
 unknown date – John Illingworth, yachtsman, yacht designer and naval officer (died 1980)

Deaths
 17 January – Quintin Hogg, philanthropist (born 1845)
 1 February – Sir George Stokes, 1st Baronet, mathematician and physicist (born 1819)
 7 February – James Glaisher, meteorologist and aeronaut (born 1809)
 4 March – Joseph Henry Shorthouse, novelist (born 1834) 
 13 March – George Granville Bradley, vicar and scholar (born 1821)
 10 April – Enderby Jackson, pioneer of the British brass band (born 1827)
 19 June – Herbert Vaughan, Catholic cardinal and archbishop (born 1832)
 11 July – W. E. Henley, poet, critic, and editor (born 1849)
 5 August – Phil May, artist (born 1864)
 22 August – Robert Cecil, Marquess of Salisbury, Prime Minister of the United Kingdom (born 1830)
 18 September – Alexander Bain, philosopher (born 1818)
 8 December – Herbert Spencer, philosopher (born 1820)
 28 December – George Gissing, novelist (born 1857)

See also
 List of British films before 1920

References

 
Years of the 20th century in the United Kingdom